The following is a list of U.S. cities with large Vietnamese-American populations.  They consist of cities with at least 10,000 Vietnamese Americans or where Vietnamese Americans constitute a large percentage of the population.  The information contained here was based on the 2010 U.S. census.

Vietnamese-Americans immigrated to the United States in different waves. The first wave of Vietnamese from just before or after the Fall of Saigon/the last day of the Vietnam War, April 30, 1975. They consisted of mostly educated, white collar public servants, senior military officers, and upper and middle class Vietnamese and their families.  The second wave came in the 1980s escaping very precariously in boats from the communist regime as boat people. In the 1990s and 2000s, a third wave came from the US's Humanitarian Operation Program, family members of Vietnamese Americans, former prisoners of re-education camps, and Amerasian children of American servicemen who applied for entry into the United States. Vietnamese Americans vary in income level, with some being upper-class while others, particular those who came later, are working-class.

Vietnamese Americans are mainly concentrated in metropolitan areas in the West, including Orange County, California, San Jose, California, and Houston, Texas.

Cities with more than 10,000 Vietnamese Americans
These cities have more than 10,000 Vietnamese Americans according to the 2012-2016 American Community Survey, sorted by number.

Major cities
These cities have more than 500,000 people consisting of at least 2% Vietnamese American in the 2010 census, sorted by percentage.

Medium cities
These cities have between 100,000 and 500,000 people and are at least 4% Vietnamese American in the 2010 Census, sorted by percentage.

Small cities
These cities have between 10,000 and 100,000 people and consist of at least 6% Vietnamese American in the 2010-15 American Community Survey, sorted by percentage.

Towns
These cities have fewer than 10,000 people and consist of at least 8% Vietnamese American in the 2010 Census, sorted by percentage.

Counties
Ten largest counties with Vietnamese Americans according to the 2010 Census, sorted by number.

See also
 Growing Up American
 Little Saigon
 Lists of U.S. cities with large ethnic population
 List of U.S. cities with Asian American majority populations

References

External links
Vietnamese American Population Statistics and Demographics

Vietnamese American
Vietnamese-American history
Vietnamese